You Know What Sailors Are is a 1928 British silent comedy drama film directed by Maurice Elvey and starring Alf Goddard, Cyril McLaglen and Chili Bouchier. It was made at Lime Grove Studios in Shepherd's Bush, London, UK. The film is based on the novel A Light for his Pipe by E.W. Townsend.

Premise
The crews of British and Spanish ships enter into a bitter rivalry.

Cast
 Alf Goddard as the British Mate
 Cyril McLaglen as the Spanish Mate
 Chili Bouchier as the Spanish Captain's Daughter
 Jerrold Robertshaw as the Spanish Captain
 Mathilde Comont as the British Captain
 Leonard Barry as the British Captain's Husband
 Mike Johnson as Seaman
 Wally Patch as Seaman

References

External links

1928 films
British silent feature films
British comedy-drama films
1928 comedy-drama films
1920s English-language films
Films directed by Maurice Elvey
Films shot at Lime Grove Studios
Seafaring films
Films set in England
British black-and-white films
1920s British films
Silent comedy-drama films
Silent adventure films